The 1988–89 was the North Stars' 22nd season. It saw the North Stars finish in third place in the Norris Division with a record of 27 wins, 37 losses, and 16 ties for 70 points. They lost the Division Semi-finals in five games to the St. Louis Blues.

Offseason

NHL Draft

Regular season

Final standings

Schedule and results

Transactions

Trades

Player statistics

Forwards
Note: GP = Games played; G = Goals; A = Assists; Pts = Points; PIM = Penalty minutes

Defencemen
Note: GP = Games played; G = Goals; A = Assists; Pts = Points; PIM = Penalty minutes

Goaltending
Note: GP = Games played; W = Wins; L = Losses; T = Ties; SO = Shutouts; GAA = Goals against average

Playoffs
Norris Division Semi-Finals
 Minnesota North Stars vs. St. Louis Blues

St. Louis wins the series 4–1

Awards and records

References
 North Stars on Hockey Database

Minn
Minn
Minnesota North Stars seasons
Minnesota Twins
Minnesota Twins